Bian Jingzhao, styled Wenjin, was a famed Chinese painter in the early Ming Dynasty. His birth and death years are unknown. He was a native of Longxi in Gansu Province and was active 1426–1435.

Notes

References
 Barnhart, R. M. et al. (1997). Three thousand years of Chinese painting. New Haven, Yale University Press. 
 Zhongguo gu dai shu hua jian ding zu. 2000. Zhongguo hui hua quan ji. Zhongguo mei shu fen lei quan ji. Beijing: Wen wu chu ban she. Volume 10.

Ming dynasty painters
Year of birth unknown
Year of death unknown
Painters from Gansu
People from Dingxi